Johann Carl Enslen, a German landscape painter, who was born in 1769 and died in 1849, was well known in his time for his panoramas, which were the first introduced into Germany. He worked with his son Carl Georg Enslen.

Sources
 Thieme-Becker: Allgemeines Lexikon der bildenden Künstler, vol. 10, Leipzig 1914, p. 568
Attribution:

External links

1759 births
1848 deaths
German landscape painters